Susi Hamilton was a Democratic member of the North Carolina House of Representatives from 2011 to 2017. Hamilton also owns the consulting firm, Hamilton Planning, which specializes in city planning and downtown economic development. In 2017, Governor Roy Cooper named her Secretary of the North Carolina Department of Natural and Cultural Resources in his Cabinet.

References

External links
 
Legislative page
Twitter account

Living people
Democratic Party members of the North Carolina House of Representatives
Politicians from Wilmington, North Carolina
21st-century American politicians
State cabinet secretaries of North Carolina
Women state legislators in North Carolina
21st-century American women politicians
Year of birth missing (living people)